Maiestas formosiella is a species of bugs from the Cicadellidae family that is endemic to Taiwan. It was formerly placed within Recilia, but a 2009 revision moved it to Maiestas.

References

Endemic fauna of Taiwan
Hemiptera of Asia
Maiestas